The 1983 Chicago White Sox season was a season in American baseball. It involved the White Sox winning the American League West championship on September 17. It marked their first postseason appearance since the 1959 World Series. It was the city of Chicago's first baseball championship of any kind (division, league, or world), since the White Sox themselves reached the World Series twenty-four years earlier.

After the White Sox went through a winning streak around the All-Star break, Texas Rangers manager Doug Rader said the White Sox "...weren't playing well. They're winning ugly." This phrase became a rallying cry for the team, and they are often referred to as the "winning ugly" team (and their uniforms as the "winning ugly" uniforms).

Offseason 
 October 12, 1982: Sparky Lyle was released by the White Sox.
 November 10, 1982: Casey Parsons was signed as a free agent by the White Sox.
 January 11, 1983: Damon Berryhill was drafted by the White Sox in the 13th round of the 1983 Major League Baseball Draft, but did not sign.
 January 25, 1983: Steve Trout and Warren Brusstar were traded by the White Sox to the Chicago Cubs for Scott Fletcher, Pat Tabler, Randy Martz, and Dick Tidrow.

Regular season 
Ron Kittle won the American League Rookie of the Year Award and set a club record for most home runs by a rookie. He missed the American League home run title by 3 home runs and finished third in the league. He would rank in ninth place in the American League for runs batted in. Kittle would manage to lead the league in strikeouts with 150.

LaMarr Hoyt won the American League Cy Young Award while fellow pitcher Floyd Bannister finished second in the American League in strikeouts. He also won 13 of 14 games after the All-Star Break.

Tony LaRussa was named American League Manager of the Year.

Opening Day lineup 
 Rudy Law, CF
 Tony Bernazard, 2B
 Harold Baines, RF
 Greg Luzinski, DH
 Greg Walker, 1B
 Tom Paciorek, LF
 Carlton Fisk, C
 Vance Law, 3B
 Scott Fletcher, SS
 LaMarr Hoyt, P

Season standings

Record vs. opponents

Notable transactions 
 April 1, 1983: Pat Tabler was traded by the White Sox to the Cleveland Indians for Jerry Dybzinski.
 June 6, 1983: Doug Drabek was drafted by the White Sox in the 11th round of the 1983 amateur draft. Player signed June 11, 1983.
 August 31, 1983: Aurelio Rodriguez was signed as a free agent with the Chicago White Sox.

Roster

Game log

Regular season 

|-style=background:#fbb
|| 1 || April 4 || @ Rangers || 7:35pm || 3–5 || Butcher (1–0) || Hoyt (0–1) || — || 13,140 || 0–1 || L1
|-style=background:#fbb
|| 2 || April 5 || @ Rangers || 7:35pm || 1–4 || Matlack (1–0) || Bannister (0–1) || Jones (1) || 6,342 || 0–2 || L2
|-style=background:#fbb
|| 3 || April 6 || @ Rangers || 7:35pm || 1–4 || Honeycutt (1–0) || Dotson (0–1) || Tobik (1) || 6,912 || 0–3 || L3
|-style=background:#bfb
|| 4 || April 8 || @ Tigers || 12:35pm || 6–3 || Lamp (1–0) || Wilcox (0–1) || Koosman (1) || 51,350 || 1–3 || W1
|-style=background:#bbb
|| – || April 9 || @ Tigers || 12:35pm ||colspan=7| Postponed (Rain, makeup date on August 8)
|-style=background:#bfb
|| 5 || April 10 || @ Tigers || 12:35pm || 7–5 || Hoyt (1–1) || Morris (1–1) || Hickey (1) || 9,980 || 2–3 || W2
|-style=background:#fbb
|| 6 || April 12 || Orioles || 1:15pm || 8–10 || Stewart (1–1) || Lamp (1–1) || — || 38,306 || 2–4 || L1
|-style=background:#bfb
|| 7 || April 14 || Orioles || 1:15pm || 12–11 || Barojas (1–0) || Welchel (0–1) || Hickey (2) || 13,622 || 3–4 || W1
|-style=background:#fbb
|| 8 || April 15 || Tigers || 7:30pm || 0–6 || Wilcox (1–1) || Hoyt (1–2) || — || 19,483 || 3–5 || L1
|-style=background:#bfb
|| 9 || April 16 || Tigers || 1:15pm || 3–1 || Bannister (1–1) || Bailey (1–1) || Tidrow (1) || 18,302 || 4–5 || W1
|-style=background:#bfb
|| 10 || April 17 || Tigers || 1:15pm || 6–1 || Lamp (2–1) || Ujdur (0–2) || — || 14,729 || 5–5 || W2
|-style=background:#bfb
|| 11 || April 19 || Yankees || 7:30pm || 13–3 || Dotson (1–1) || Howell (0–1) || — || 14,730 || 6–5 || W3
|-style=background:#fbb
|| 12 || April 20 || Yankees || 7:30pm || 4–6 || Righetti (3–0) || Hoyt (1–3) || — || 11,916 || 6–6 || L1
|-style=background:#fbb
|| 13 || April 22 || @ Indians || 1:05pm || 1–5 || Blyleven (1–3) || Bannister (1–2) || — || 5,393 || 6–7 || L2
|-style=background:#fbb
|| 14 || April 23 || @ Indians || 1:05pm || 3–6 || Barker (3–1) || Lamp (2–2) || — || 10,688 || 6–8 || L3
|-style=background:#bfb
|| 15 || April 24 || @ Indians || 1:05pm || 9–3 || Dotson (2–1) || Sutcliffe (2–1) || — || 6,274 || 7–8 || W1
|-style=background:#fbb
|| 16 || April 26 || @ Brewers || 7:00pm || 3–4 || Slaton (2–0) || Hickey (0–1) || — || 19,558 || 7–9 || L1
|-style=background:#fbb
|| 17 || April 27 || @ Brewers || 7:00pm || 2–6 || Tellmann (2–0) || Bannister (1–3) || Gibson (1) || 16,375 || 7–10 || L2
|-style=background:#bfb
|| 18 || April 29 || @ Blue Jays || 6:30pm || 9–3 || Dotson (3–1) || Leal (0–3) || Tidrow (2) || 13,212 || 8–10 || W1 
|-style=background:#bbb
|| – || April 30 || @ Blue Jays || 12:30pm ||colspan=7| Postponed (Rain, makeup date on July 26)
|-

|-style=background:#fbb
|| 19 || May 1 || @ Blue Jays || 12:30pm || 0–8 || Steib (4–2) || Bannister (1–4) || — || 18,769 || 8–11 || L1
|-style=background:#fbb
|| 20 || May 2 || Brewers || 7:30pm || 4–8 || Slaton (3–0) || Hoyt (1–4) || — || 12,568 || 8–12 || L2
|-style=background:#bfb
|| 21 || May 3 || Brewers || 7:30pm || 7–6 || Dotson (4–1) || Porter (0–1) || Hickey (3) || 13,113 || 9–12 || W1
|-style=background:#bfb
|| 22 || May 4 || Brewers || 7:30pm || 3–2 || Lamp (3–2) || McClure (0–5) || Hickey (4) || 17,097 || 10–12 || W2
|-style=background:#bfb
|| 23 || May 6 || Indians || 7:30pm || 8–3 || Koosman (1–0) || Sorensen (2–4) || — || 20,912 || 11–12 || W3
|-style=background:#bfb
|| 24 || May 7 || Indians || 1:15pm || 4–3 || Hoyt (2–4) || Eichelberger (0–1) || Hickey (5) || 18,245 || 12–12 || W4
|-style=background:#fbb
|| 25 || May 8 || Indians || 1:15pm || 6–13 || Blyleven (3–3) || Dotson (4–2) || — || 12,960 || 12–13 || L1
|-style=background:#fbb
|| 26 || May 9 || Blue Jays || 7:30pm || 1–6 || Leal (2–3) || Burns (0–1) || — || 9,848 || 12–14 || L2
|-style=background:#fbb
|| 27 || May 11 || Blue Jays || 7:30pm || 1–3 (10) || Steib (6–2) || Hoyt (2–5) || — || 18,844 || 12–15 || L3
|-style=background:#fbb
|| 28 || May 13 || @ Yankees || 7:00pm || 1–3 || Righetti (5–1) || Dotson (4–3) || Gossage (3) || 22,104 || 12–16 || L4
|-style=background:#fbb
|| 29 || May 14 || @ Yankees || 12:20pm || 5–8 || Shirley (2–2) || Burns (0–2) || Gossage (4) || 30,031 || 12–17 || L5
|-style=background:#bfb
|| 30 || May 15 || @ Yankees || 1:00pm || 7–3 || Bannister (2–4) || Rawley (4–3) || Barojas (1) || 31,321 || 13–17 || W1
|-style=background:#bbb
|| – || May 16 || @ Orioles || 6:35pm ||colspan=7| Postponed (Rain, makeup date on May 17)
|-style=background:#bfb
|| 31 || May 17 || @ Orioles || 4:35pm || 2–7 || Stoddard (2–0) || Hoyt (2–6) || — || N/A || 13–18 || L1
|-style=background:#bfb
|| 32 || May 17 || @ Orioles || 8:26pm || 0–5 || Boddicker (1–0) || Lamp (3–3) || — || 14,314 || 13–19 || L2
|-style=background:#bfb
|| 33 || May 18 || @ Orioles || 6:35pm || 0–1 || Martinez (2–1) || Dotson (4–4) || — || 12,582 || 13–20 || L3
|-style=background:#bfb
|| 34 || May 20 || @ Royals || 7:35pm || 9–6 || Burns (1–2) || Blue (0–3) || Barojas (2) || 20,027 || 14–20 || W1
|-style=background:#fbb
|| 35 || May 21 || @ Royals || 1:20pm || 4–8 || Renko (3–3) || Bannister (2–5) || — || 28,792 || 14–21 || L1
|-style=background:#bfb
|| 36 || May 22 || @ Royals || 1:35pm || 11–3 || Hoyt (3–6) || Gura (4–5) || — || 31,210 || 15–21 || W1
|-style=background:#fbb
|| 37 || May 23 || Red Sox || 7:30pm || 4–6 || Brown (4–3) || Dotson (4–5) || — || 16,582 || 15–22 || L1
|-style=background:#bfb
|| 38 || May 24 || Red Sox || 7:30pm || 14–4 || Koosman (2–0) || Bird (1–2) || Tidrow (3) || 14,680 || 16–22 || W1
|-style=background:#fbb
|| 39 || May 25 || Red Sox || 7:30pm || 0–2 || Hurst (4–2) || Lamp (3–4) || — || 18,798 || 16–23 || L1
|-style=background:#fbb
|| 40 || May 26 || Rangers || 7:30pm || 1–3 || Honeycutt (6–3) || Bannister (2–6) || Jones (6) || 17,232 || 16–24 || L2
|-style=background:#bfb
|| 41 || May 27 || Rangers || 7:30pm || 3–2 || Hoyt (4–6) || Tanana (1–1) || — || 17,527 || 17–24 || W1
|-style=background:#bfb
|| 42 || May 28 || Rangers || 3:05pm || 8–3 || Dotson (5–5) || Hough (2–5) || Tidrow (4) || 18,197 || 18–24 || W2
|-style=background:#bfb
|| 43 || May 29 || Rangers || 1:15pm || 8–3 || Koosman (3–0) || Smithson (3–3) || — || 23,239 || 19–24 || W3
|-style=background:#bfb
|| 44 || May 30 || @ Red Sox || 1:05pm || 6–4 || Burns (2–2) || Hurst (4–3) || Barojas (3) || 20,023 || 20–24 || W4
|-style=background:#fbb
|| 45 || May 31 || @ Red Sox || 6:35pm || 1–2 || Ojeda (3–1) || Bannister (2–7) || Stanley (10) || 15,135 || 20–25 || L1
|-

|-style=background:#bfb
|| 46 || June 1 || @ Red Sox || 6:35pm || 8–3 || Hoyt (5–6) || Tudor (3–3) || — || 17,751 || 21–25 || W1
|-style=background:#bfb
|| 47 || June 2 || Royals || 7:30pm || 6–3 || Agosto (1–0) || Gura (4–7) || — || 17,710 || 22–25 || W2
|-style=background:#bfb
|| 48 || June 3 || Royals || 7:30pm || 2–0 || Koosman (4–0) || Creel (0–1) || — || 19,533 || 23–25 || W3
|-style=background:#fbb
|| 49 || June 4 || Royals || 5:55pm || 1–7 || Splittorff (3–1) || Burns (2–3) || — || 34,260 || 23–26 || L1
|-style=background:#fbb
|| 50 || June 5 || Royals || 11:30am || 5–7 || Quisenberry (2–1) || Hickey (0–2) || — || N/A || 23–27 || L2
|-style=background:#bfb
|| 51 || June 5 || Royals || 3:18pm || 5–2 || Hoyt (6–6) || Armstrong (2–3) || Agosto (1) || 31,377 || 24–27 || W1
|-style=background:#bfb
|| 52 || June 7 || @ Angels || 9:30pm || 12–11 (10) || Tidrow (1–0)
|-style=background:#fbb
|| 53 || June 8 || @ Angels || 9:30pm || 4–7 || || Koosman (4–1)
|-style=background:#fbb
|| 54 || June 9 || @ Angels || 9:30pm || 2–3 || || Lamp (3–5)
|-style=background:#fbb
|| 55 || June 10 || @ Athletics || 9:35pm || 1–2 (16) || || Tidrow (1–1)
|-style=background:#fbb
|| 56 || June 11 || @ Athletics || 3:05pm || 4–5 || || Hoyt (6–7)
|-style=background:#bfb
|| 57 || June 12 || @ Athletics || 2:35pm || 12–10 (11) || Tidrow (2–1)
|-style=background:#bfb
|| 58 || June 12 || @ Athletics || 7:21pm || 8–1 || Koosman (5–1)
|-style=background:#fbb
|| 59 || June 13 || Angels || 7:30pm || 4–7
|-style=background:#bbb
|| – || June 14 || Angels || 6:30pm ||colspan=7| Postponed (Rain, makeup date on September 8)
|-style=background:#bfb
|| 60 || June 15 || Angels || 7:30pm || 5–2 || Hoyt (7–7)
|-style=background:#bfb
|| 61 || June 17 || Athletics || 7:30pm || 6–3
|-style=background:#fbb
|| 62 || June 18 || Athletics || 12:20pm || 1–3
|-style=background:#bfb
|| 63 || June 19 || Athletics || 1:15pm || 1–0
|-style=background:#bfb
|| 64 || June 20 || Mariners || 7:30pm || 7–3 || Hoyt (8–7)
|-style=background:#bfb
|| 65 || June 21 || Mariners || 7:30pm || 4–2
|-style=background:#bfb
|| 66 || June 22 || Mariners || 7:30pm || 6–3 || Koosman (6–1)
|-style=background:#bfb
|| 67 || June 23 || Twins || 1:15pm || 8–6 || Lamp (1)
|-style=background:#fbb
|| 68 || June 24 || Twins || 7:30pm || 1–5
|-style=background:#bfb
|| 69 || June 25 || Twins || 7:30pm || 8–3 || Hoyt (9–7)
|-style=background:#bfb
|| 70 || June 26 || Twins || 1:15pm || 9–7
|-style=background:#bfb
|| 71 || June 27 || @ Mariners || 9:35pm || 7–4 || Lamp (4–5)
|-style=background:#fbb
|| 72 || June 28 || @ Mariners || 9:35pm || 2–6
|-style=background:#bfb
|| 73 || June 29 || @ Mariners || 2:35pm || 5–3
|-

|-style=background:#fbb
|| 74 || July 1 || @ Twins || 7:35pm || 3–6
|-style=background:#bfb
|| 75 || July 2 || @ Twins || 7:35pm || 4–2
|-style=background:#fbb
|| 76 || July 3 || @ Twins || 1:15pm || 3–4
|-style=background:#bfb
|| 77 || July 4 || @ Twins || 12:15pm || 12–6 || Lamp (5–5)
|-style=background:#bbbfff
|| — || July 6 || colspan="10"|54th All-Star Game in Chicago, IL
|-style=background:#fbb
|| 78 || July 8 || Brewers || 7:30pm || 3–4 || McClure (5–7) || Hoyt (9–9) || Augustine (1) || 36,415 || 40–38 || L1
|-style=background:#bfb
|| 79 || July 9 || Brewers || 1:15pm || 8–3 || Koosman (7–1) || Sutton (6–5) || — || 27,770 || 41–38 || W1
|-style=background:#fbb
|| 80 || July 10 || Brewers || 1:15pm || 9–12 || Slaton (8–3) || Barojas (1–2) || Ladd (5) || 28,988|| 41–39 || L1
|-style=background:#bfb
|| 81 || July 11 || Indians || 7:30pm || 9–2 || Burns (5–5) || Barker (6–9) || — || 18,473 || 42–39 || W1
|-style=background:#bfb
|| 82 || July 12 || Indians || 7:30pm || 8–0 || Bannister (4–9) || Sorensen (4–8) || — || 16,799 || 43–39 || W2
|-style=background:#bfb
|| 83 || July 13 || Indians || 7:30pm || 5–1 || Hoyt (10–9) || Blyleven (6–9) || — || 22,700 || 44–39 || W3
|-style=background:#fbb
|| 84 || July 14 || Blue Jays || 7:30pm || 0–8 || Leal (10–5) || Koosman (7–2) || — || 17,883 || 44–40 || L1
|-style=background:#fbb
|| 85 || July 15 || Blue Jays || 7:30pm || 2–3 || McLaughlin (2–2) || Dotson (8–6) || — || 28,288 || 44–41 || L2
|-style=background:#fbb
|| 86 || July 16 || Blue Jays || 5:55pm || 5–7 || McLaughlin (3–2) || Agosto (1–1) || Moffitt (9) || 34,243 || 44–42 || L3
|-style=background:#bfb
|| 87 || July 17 || Blue Jays || 1:15pm || 3–2 || Bannister (5–9) || Alexander (0–3) || Lamp (2) || 30,140 || 45–42 || W1
|-style=background:#bfb
|| 88 || July 18 || @ Indians || 7:15pm || 5–3 || Hoyt (11–9) || Eichelberger (3–10) || Barojas (9) || 6,339 || 46–42 || W2
|-style=background:#fbb
|| 89 || July 19 || @ Indians || 6:35pm || 4–5 || Sutcliffe (12–4) || Tidrow (2–2) || — || 5,933 || 46–43 || L1
|-style=background:#bfb
|| 90 || July 20 || @ Indians || 6:35pm || 8–2 || Dotson (9–6) || Heaton (5–3) || — || 6,296 || 47–43 || W1
|-style=background:#fbb
|| 91 || July 21 || @ Brewers || 7:30pm || 6–7 || Ladd (2–2) || Agosto (1–2) || Slaton (4) || 29,609 || 47–44 || L1
|-style=background:#bfb
|| 92 || July 22 || @ Brewers || 7:30pm || 2–1 || Bannister (6–9) || Porter (2–5) || Lamp (3) || 44,167 || 48–44 || W1
|-style=background:#fbb
|| 93 || July 23 || @ Brewers || 7:30pm || 7–8 || McClure (7–7) || Hoyt (11–10) || Ladd (9) || 52,795 || 48–45 || L1
|-style=background:#fbb
|| 94 || July 24 || @ Brewers || 1:30pm || 7–8 || Ladd (3–2) || Tidrow (2–3) || — || 46,171 || 48–46 || L2
|-style=background:#bfb
|| 95 || July 25 || @ Blue Jays || 6:30pm || 7–4 || Dotson (10–6) || Steib (11–9) || Lamp (4) || 24,394 || 49–46 || W1
|-style=background:#fbb
|| 96 || July 26 || @ Blue Jays || 4:30pm || 4–6 || Gott (6–8) || Burns (5–6) || McLaughlin (8) || N/A || 49–47 || L1
|-style=background:#bfb
|| 97 || July 26 || @ Blue Jays || 7:31pm || 4–3 || Bannister (7–9) || Alexander (0–4) || Lamp (5) || 33,554 || 50–47 || W1
|-style=background:#bfb
|| 98 || July 27 || @ Blue Jays || 6:30pm || 11–3 || Hoyt (12–10) || Leal (10–9) || — || 36,012 || 51–47 || W2
|-style=background:#bfb
|| 99 || July 29 || Yankees || 7:30pm || 7–2 || Koosman (8–2) || Guidry (12–6) || — || 40,455 || 52–47 || W3
|-style=background:#bfb
|| 100 || July 30 || Yankees || 7:30pm || 5–1 || Dotson (11–6) || Rawley (9–9) || — || 46,219 || 53–47 || W4
|-style=background:#fbb
|| 101 || July 31 || Yankees || 1:15pm || 6–12 (11) || Gossage (9–4) || Lamp (5–6) || — || 40,778 || 53–48 || L1
|-

|-style=background:#bfb
|| 102 || August 1 || Yankees || 7:15pm || 4–1 || Boddicker (7–5) || Fontenot (3–1) || — || 44,812 || 54–48 || W1
|-style=background:#bfb
|| 103 || August 2 || Tigers || 7:30pm || 7–5 || Hoyt (13–10) || Petry (11–7) || Lamp (6) || 30,611 || 55–48 || W2
|-style=background:#fbb
|| 104 || August 3 || Tigers || 7:30pm || 3–6 || Morris (12–8) || Koosman (8–3) || — || 26,687 || 55–49 || L1
|-style=background:#bfb
|| 105 || August 4 || Tigers || 7:30pm || 4–2 || Dotson (12–6) || Bair (3–3) || Lamp (7) || 38,695 || 56–49 || W1
|-style=background:#fbb
|| 106 || August 5 || @ Orioles || 7:05pm || 4–5 || Boddicker (8–5) || Lamp (5–7) || — || 39,544 || 56–50 || L1
|-style=background:#bfb
|| 107 || August 6 || @ Orioles || 6:35pm || 6–4 || Bannister (9–9) || Martínez (6–14) || Barojas (10) || 32,769 || 57–50 || W1
|-style=background:#bfb
|| 108 || August 7 || @ Orioles || 1:05pm || 4–3 || Hoyt (14–10) || Flanagan (6–1) || Lamp (8) || 24,384 || 58–50 || W2
|-style=background:#bfb
|| 109 || August 8 || @ Tigers || 4:05pm || 5–4 || Burns (6–6) || Berenguer (5–3) || Barojas (11) || TBA G2 || 59–50 || W3
|-style=background:#fbb
|| 110 || August 8 || @ Tigers || 7:12pm || 2–7 || Morris (13–8) || Koosman (8–4) || — || 42,337 || 59–51 || L1
|-style=background:#bfb
|| 111 || August 9 || @ Tigers || 6:35pm || 6–5 || Lamp (6–7) || López (7–5) || — || 23,465 || 60–51 || W1
|-style=background:#bbb
|| – || August 10 || @ Tigers || 6:35pm ||colspan=7| Postponed (Rain, makeup date on August 25)
|-style=background:#bfb
|| 112 || August 11 || Orioles || 7:30pm || 9–3 || Bannister (10–9) || Ramirez (4–3) || — || 31,810 || 61–51 || W2
|-style=background:#bfb
|| 113 || August 12 || Orioles || 7:30pm || 2–1 || Hoyt (15–10) || Flanagan (6–2) || — || 45,588 || 61–52 || W3
|-style=background:#fbb
|| 114 || August 13 || Orioles || 7:30pm || 2–5 || Stewart (5–3) || Koosman (8–5) || Martinez (12) || 36,232 || 62–52 || L1
|-style=background:#fbb
|| 115 || August 14 || Orioles || 1:15pm || 1–2 || McGregor (15–5) || Dotson (12–7) || Stoddard (5) || 37,846 || 62–53 || L2
|-style=background:#bfb
|| 116 || August 15 || @ Yankees || 7:00pm || 1–0 || Burns (7–6) || Righetti (13–4) || — || 30,206 || 63–53 || W1
|-style=background:#bfb
|| 117 || August 16 || @ Yankees || 7:00pm || 5–3 || Bannister (11–9) || Fontenot (4–2) || Lamp (9) || 26,989 || 64–53 || W2
|-style=background:#bfb
|| 118 || August 17 || @ Yankees || 7:00pm || 7–5 (13) || Barojas (2–2) || Murray (2–4) || — || 30,274 || 65–53 || W3
|-style=background:#bfb
|| 119 || August 19 || @ Rangers || 5:35pm || 3–2 (10) || Dotson (13–7) || Cruz (0–2) || Agosto (6) || TBA G2 || 66–53 || W4
|-style=background:#bfb
|| 120 || August 19 || @ Rangers || 8:53pm || 6–1 || Koosman (9–5) || Hough (10–11) || Tidrow (6) || 21,946 || 67–53 || W5
|-style=background:#fbb
|| 121 || August 20 || @ Rangers || 7:35pm || 1–6 || Stewart (1–0) || Burns (7–7) || Henke (1) || 21,232 || 67–54 || L1
|-style=background:#bfb
|| 122 || August 21 || @ Rangers || 7:35pm || 3–1 || Bannister (12–9) || Butcher (4–4) || Barojas (12) || 11,861 || 68–54 || W1
|-style=background:#bfb
|| 123 || August 22 || @ Royals || 7:35pm || 3–1 || Hoyt (16–10) || Splittorff (9–6) || — || 31,479 || 69–54 || W2
|-style=background:#fbb
|| 124 || August 23 || @ Royals || 7:35pm || 2–10 || Renko (6–10) || Koosman (9–6) || — || 18,767 || 69–55 || L1
|-style=background:#bfb
|| 125 || August 24 || @ Royals || 7:35pm || 4–3 (10) || Dotson (14–7) || Quisenberry (5–3) || Lamp (10) || 19,056 || 70–55 || W1
|-style=background:#fbb
|| 126 || August 25 || @ Tigers || 6:35pm || 1–10 || Berenguer (7–4) || Burns (7–8) || — || 29,028 || 70–56 || L1
|-style=background:#fbb
|| 127 || August 26 || Red Sox || 7:30pm || 1–3 || Hurst (10–10) || Bannister (12–10) || Stanley (25) || 36,161 || 70–57 || L2
|-style=background:#bfb
|| 128 || August 27 || Red Sox || 5:55pm || 2–1 || Hoyt (17–10) || Ojeda (6–7) || — || 43,556 || 71–57 || W1
|-style=background:#bfb
|| 129 || August 28 || Red Sox || 1:15pm || 6–2 || Koosman (10–6) || Boyd (3–4) || Lamp (11) || 33,419 || 72–57 || W2
|-style=background:#bfb
|| 130 || August 29 || Rangers || 7:30pm || 2–1 || Dotson (15–7) || Smithson (7–13) || — || 33,987 || 73–57 || W3
|-style=background:#bfb
|| 131 || August 30 || Rangers || 7:30pm || 5–0 || Burns (8–8) || Stewart (1–1) || Tidrow (7) || 26,666 || 74–57 || W4
|-style=background:#bfb
|| 132 || August 31 || Royals || 7:30pm || 7–3 || Bannister (13–10) || Gura (10–16) || — || 31,346 || 75–57 || W5
|-

|-style=background:#bfb
|| 133 || September 1 || Royals || 7:30pm || 12–0 || Hoyt (18–10) || Black (8–5) || — || 30,852 || 76–57 || W6
|-style=background:#fbb
|| 134 || September 2 || @ Red Sox || 6:35pm || 1–5 || Boyd (4–4) || Koosman (10–7) || — || 24,572 || 76–58 || L1
|-style=background:#bfb
|| 135 || September 3 || @ Red Sox || 1:15pm || 9–6 || Dotson (16–7) || Tudor (10–10) || — || 21,904 || 77–58 || W1
|-style=background:#fbb
|| 136 || September 4 || @ Red Sox || 1:05pm || 2–6 || Hurst (4–3) || Burns (8–9) || — || 21,696 || 77–59 || L1
|-style=background:#bfb
|| 137 || September 5 || Athletics || 1:15pm || 11–1
|-style=background:#bfb
|| 138 || September 6 || Athletics || 7:30pm || 7–6 || Lamp (12)
|-style=background:#bfb
|| 139 || September 7 || Athletics || 7:30pm || 8–7 (10)
|-style=background:#bfb
|| 140 || September 8 || Angels || 7:30pm || 8–5
|-style=background:#bfb
|| 141 || September 9 || Angels || 7:30pm || 11–0
|-style=background:#bfb
|| 142 || September 10 || Angels || 7:30pm || 7–6 (12)
|-style=background:#bfb
|| 143 || September 11 || Angels || 5:55pm || 5–4 (10)
|-style=background:#bfb
|| 144 || September 13 || @ Twins || 7:35pm || 5–1
|-style=background:#fbb
|| 145 || September 14 || @ Twins || 7:35pm || 0–1
|-style=background:#bfb
|| 146 || September 15 || Mariners || 7:30pm || 12–0 (7)
|-style=background:#bfb
|| 147 || September 16 || Mariners || 7:30pm || 7–0
|-style=background:#bfb
|| 148 || September 17 || Mariners || 7:30pm || 4–3 || Lamp (7–7)
|-style=background:#bfb
|| 149 || September 18 || Mariners || 1:15pm || 6–0
|-style=background:#fbb
|| 150 || September 19 || Twins || 7:30pm || 5–7
|-style=background:#bbb
|| – || September 20 || Twins || 7:30pm ||colspan=7| Postponed (Rain, makeup date on September 21)
|-style=background:#bfb
|| 151 || September 21 || Twins || 4:00pm || 2–1
|-style=background:#bfb
|| 152 || September 21 || Twins || 6:43pm || 7–6
|-style=background:#bfb
|| 153 || September 22 || @ Angels || 9:30pm || 3–2 || Koosman (11–7)
|-style=background:#bfb
|| 154 || September 23 || @ Angels || 9:30pm || 2–1
|-style=background:#bfb
|| 155 || September 24 || @ Angels || 3:00pm || 2–0
|-style=background:#bfb
|| 156 || September 25 || @ Angels || 3:00pm || 8–5 || Lamp (13)
|-style=background:#fbb
|| 157 || September 27 || @ Athletics || 9:35pm || 4–5
|-style=background:#bfb
|| 158 || September 28 || @ Athletics || 2:15pm || 5–3 || Lamp (14)
|-style=background:#fbb
|| 159 || September 29 || @ Athletics || 9:35pm || 0–3
|-style=background:#bfb
|| 160 || September 30 || @ Mariners || 9:35pm || 9–4
|-

|-style=background:#bfb
|| 161 || October 1 || @ Mariners || 9:35pm || 9–3 || Koosman (1)
|-style=background:#bfb
|| 162 || October 2 || @ Mariners || 3:35pm || 3–0 || Lamp (15)
|-

|- style="text-align:center;"
| Legend:       = Win       = Loss       = PostponementBold = White Sox team member

Postseason 

|- bgcolor=#ccffcc
| 1 || October 5 || @ Orioles || 2–1 || Hoyt (1–0) || McGregor (0–1) || — || Memorial Stadium || 51,289 || 1–0
|- bgcolor=#ffcccc
| 2 || October 6 || @ Orioles || 0–4 || Boddicker (1–0) || Bannister (0–1) || — || Memorial Stadium || 52,347 || 1–1
|- bgcolor=#ffcccc
| 3 || October 7 || Orioles || 1–11 || Flanagan (1–0) || Dotson (0–1) || Stewart (1) || Comiskey Park || 46,635 || 1–2
|- bgcolor=#ffcccc
| 4 || October 8 || Orioles || 0–3 (10) || Martinez (1–0) || Burns (0–1) || — || Comiskey Park || 45,577 || 1–3

All-Star game 
The 54th playing of the midsummer classic between the all-stars of the American League (AL) and National League (NL) was held on July 6, 1983, at Comiskey Park. The game resulted in the American League defeating the National League 13–3. The game occurred exactly 50 years to the date of the first All-Star game. The game is best remembered for Fred Lynn's third-inning grand slam off of San Francisco's Atlee Hammaker. As of 2021, it is the only grand slam in All-Star Game history.

Player stats

Batting 
Note: G = Games played; AB = At bats; R = Runs scored; H = Hits; 2B = Doubles; 3B = Triples; HR = Home runs; RBI = Runs batted in; BB = Base on balls; SO = Strikeouts; AVG = Batting average; SB = Stolen bases

Pitching 
Note: W = Wins; L = Losses; ERA = Earned run average; G = Games pitched; GS = Games started; SV = Saves; IP = Innings pitched; H = Hits allowed; R = Runs allowed; ER = Earned runs allowed; HR = Home runs allowed; BB = Walks allowed; K = Strikeouts

American League Championship Series

Summary

Game One 
October 5, Memorial Stadium

Playing in their first postseason game since the 1959 World Series, the White Sox jumped out to a 1–0 series lead behind a complete-game victory by Hoyt, the American League Cy Young Award winner.

Game Two 
October 6, Memorial Stadium

Game Three 
October 7, Comiskey Park

Game Four 
October 8, Comiskey Park

Award winners 
 LaMarr Hoyt, American League Cy Young Award
 Ron Kittle, American League Rookie of the Year Award
 Tony La Russa, American League Manager of the Year Award
 Tony La Russa, Associated Press AL Manager of the Year
 Roland Hemond, Executive of the Year

All-Star Game
 Ron Kittle, reserve

Farm system 

LEAGUE CHAMPIONS: Denver, Appleton

Notes

References 
 
 1983 Chicago White Sox team page at Baseball Reference
 1983 Chicago White Sox team page at www.baseball-almanac.com

Chicago White Sox seasons
Chicago White Sox
American League West champion seasons
Chicago White Sox